This is a list of the National Register of Historic Places listings in Chautauqua County, New York.

This is intended to be a complete list of properties and districts listed on the National Register of Historic Places in Chautauqua County, New York, United States.  The locations of National Register properties and districts for which the latitude and longitude coordinates are included below, may be seen in a map.

There are 50 properties and districts listed on the National Register in the county, including 2 National Historic Landmarks.



Current listings

|}

See also

List of National Historic Landmarks in New York
National Register of Historic Places listings in New York

References

Chautauqua County, New York
Chautauqua County